Ponta Porã Sociedade Esportiva, commonly referred to as Ponta Porã, is a Brazilian football club based in Ponta Porã, Mato Grosso do Sul.

History
The club was founded on 2 March 1998. Ponta Porã won the Campeonato Sul-Mato-Grossense Second Level in 2010.

Achievements

 Campeonato Sul-Mato-Grossense Second Level:
 Winners (1): 2010

Stadium
Ponta Porã Sociedade Esportiva play their home games at Estádio Municipal Aral Moreira. The stadium has a maximum capacity of 6,000 people.

References

Association football clubs established in 1998
Football clubs in Mato Grosso do Sul
1998 establishments in Brazil
Ponta Porã